81st Brigade may refer to:

 81st Mechanized Brigade (Romania), a unit of the Romanian Army
 81st Mixed Brigade, a unit of the Spanish Republican Army
 81st Brigade (United Kingdom), a formation of the British Army in the First World War
 81st Armored Brigade Combat Team (United States), a unit of the United States Army 
 81st Airmobile Brigade (Ukraine), a unit of the Ukrainian Air Assault Forces

See also
 81st Division (disambiguation)
 81st Regiment (disambiguation)
 81st Squadron (disambiguation)